The 2010 BSWW Mundialito was a beach soccer tournament that took place at a temporary stadium at Praia da Rocha, Portimão, Portugal from August 6 to 8. This competition was played in a round-robin format.

Participating nations

Final standings

Schedule and results

See also
Beach soccer
BSWW Mundialito
Euro Beach Soccer League

References

External links
Beach Soccer Worldwide
Mundialito page at Portimão web site

BSWW Mundialito
2010–11 in Portuguese football
2010 in beach soccer